Jean-Paul Colonval (born 2 February 1940) was a Belgian football player who finished top scorer of the Belgian First Division with 25 goals in 1965 while playing for Tilleur. He later played for R. Standard de Liège, but never for the Belgium national team. Colonval was a technical director at R.A.E.C. Mons from 2006 to 2007. He is now the technical advisor of FC Brussels president Mr Vermeersch. He is the director of the "Football Study" section at the highly respected college of Bonne Esperance - Rue Grégoire Jurion, 22 -
7120 Vellereille-les-Brayeux  - Hainaut - Belgium - "www.bonne-esperance.be".

He also coached Racing Jet de Bruxelles, Charleroi and Víkingur.

References

External links
Biography

1940 births
Living people
Belgian footballers
Standard Liège players
Belgian Pro League players
Belgian football managers
R. Charleroi S.C. managers
Expatriate football managers in Iceland
Knattspyrnufélagið Víkingur managers
K.F.C. Rhodienne-De Hoek players
People from Tienen
Association football forwards
R.F.C. Tilleur players
Footballers from Flemish Brabant